Artemis Singers is an American lesbian feminist chorus based in Chicago, Illinois. Its goals are to create positive change in cultural attitudes toward women and female artists and to "increase the visibility of lesbian feminists."

Founded in 1980, it is one of the earliest lesbian feminist chorus in the United States. In 2008, Artemis was inducted into the Chicago Gay and Lesbian Hall of Fame. The group only performs music created by female composers or lyricists, or arranged by female arrangers. During the group's early period, they had an assigned traditional music director but the system gradually evolved into a self-organized, non-hierarchical system. Currently, several members act as music directors during each performance.

References 

Feminist organizations in the United States
Lesbian culture in Illinois
Lesbian feminist organizations
Lesbian organizations in the United States
LGBT choruses
LGBT culture in Chicago
Musical groups from Chicago